The Wraysbury River is an anabranch of the River Colne to the west of London.

Course
The river leaves the Colne at West Drayton and runs under the M4 motorway then close to Longford when it  passes under the M25 motorway. A branch then feeds the Colne Brook by the Poyle Channel while the Wraysbury River runs parallel to the M25, crossing back under it by the Wraysbury Reservoir. It then flows into Staines and rejoins the River Colne in the town centre, shortly before it flows into the River Thames.

The northern part of the river's course has been heavily modified to accommodate the M4 and M25 motorways.

References

See also
List of rivers of England

1Wraysbury
Rivers of Berkshire
Rivers of Buckinghamshire